Jacob Swank House is a historic home located near Charleston, Mississippi County, Missouri.  It was built in 1839, and is a two-story, five bay, "L"-plan, Classic Revival style orange-red brick dwelling.  It measures approximately 40 feet, 6 inches, by 36 feet, 9 inches, and is topped by a simple ridge roof.  The front facade features a three bay hip roofed front porch.

It was added to the National Register of Historic Places in 1973.

References

Houses on the National Register of Historic Places in Missouri
Neoclassical architecture in Missouri
Houses completed in 1839
Buildings and structures in Mississippi County, Missouri
National Register of Historic Places in Mississippi County, Missouri